The Pont de Bercy (English: Bridge of Bercy) is a bridge over the Seine in Paris. It links the 12th and 13th arrondissement of Paris by extending the Boulevard de Bercy and Boulevard Vincent-Auriol. In addition to the roadway, the bridge also carries Line 6 of the Paris Métro, between Quai de la Gare station and Bercy station.

History

The Pont de Bercy was built at the site of another bridge, a suspension bridge opened in 1832 to replace a ferry that had become overcrowded and thus exceeded its tonnage limit. The former bridge had a toll: one sou (5 centimes) for pedestrians, 3 sous per two-wheeled cabriolet (including persons transported) and 5 sous per car with four wheels attached to two horses. Between 1863 and 1864, it was replaced by a stronger stone structure.

In 1986, the decision was made to further enlarge the bridge in order to create three additional lanes for traffic. The winning bid proposed doubling the bridge by adding extensions perfectly symmetrical to the underground viaduct. Although identical in all respects to the original, the new addition is built of reinforced concrete and covered with a stone dressing.

In Popular Culture

The Pont de Bercy is referenced in the well-known song "Sous le ciel de Paris" (Under the sky of Paris) sung by Yves Montand, Edith Piaf and many others. The song mentions a philosopher sitting on the bridge, and two musicians playing there for a few onlookers.

See also 
 Pont de Bir-Hakeim
 List of crossings of the Seine

Bercy
Bercy
Buildings and structures in the 12th arrondissement of Paris
13th arrondissement of Paris
Former toll bridges in France
1864 establishments in France